This article describes the bridge convention.

Mylläri is a bridge convention used to intervene over opponents' 1NT opening. Typically it only applies if the opponents are using a strong 1NT opening (where 14 points or more is the minimum). Its invention is attributed to Jay Barron and is named after Finnish Bridge player Maria Mylläri.

Over 1NT (Direct seat)
 Double shows a 4 card major and a longer minor, or 5 and a 4 or 5 card minor. Responder bids 2 to play the minor, 2 to play the major, or make a natural 2 major bid. Over a 2 bid, 2 shows 5 with a minor.
2 shows both majors, possibly 5-4. If responder does not have a preference, he bids 2 to let opener pick.
2 is a transfer to hearts,
2 is a transfer to spades,
2 shows 5 spades and a minor,
2NT shows both minors
3 of a minor shows a long minor and is constructive, 
3 of a major is pre-emptive.

Over 1NT Pass Pass (Balancing seat)
 Double shows any 2 suited hand with a major and a minor. Responder bids the cheapest suit he wishes to play.
2 shows both majors, possibly 5-4. If responder does not have a preference, he bids 2 to let opener pick.
2 is natural,
2 is natural,
2 is natural,
2NT shows both minors,
3 of a minor shows a long minor and is constructive, 
3 of a major shows a long major and is constructive

See also
List of defenses to 1NT

References

Bridge conventions